United Nations Security Council Resolution 343, adopted on December 14, 1973, after reaffirming previous resolutions on the topic, and noting recent encouraging developments, the Council extended the stationing in Cyprus of the United Nations Peacekeeping Force in Cyprus for a further period, now ending on June 15, 1974.  The Council also called upon the parties directly concerned to continue to act with the utmost restraint and to co-operate fully with the peacekeeping force.

Resolution 343 was adopted by 14 votes to none, with one abstention from the People's Republic of China.

See also
 Cyprus dispute
 List of United Nations Security Council Resolutions 301 to 400 (1971–1976)

References 
Text of the Resolution at undocs.org

External links
 

 0343
 0343
December 1973 events